Embiya Ayyıldız (born 5 July 2000) is a Turkish professional footballer who plays as a forward for Zonguldak Kömürspor on loan from Ankaragücü.

Professional career
A youth product of Altınordu, Ayyıldız began his senior career on loan with Niğde Anadolu before moving to Ergene Velimeşe in 2020. On 21 January 2021, he signed a professional contract with Ankaragücü  for 2.5 years. Ayyıldız made his professional debut with Ankaragücü in a 1–1 Süper Lig tie with Denizlispor on 21 April 2021.

References

External links
 
 

2000 births
People from Konya Province
Living people
Turkish footballers
Turkey youth international footballers
Association football forwards
Altınordu F.K. players
Niğde Anadolu FK footballers
MKE Ankaragücü footballers
Zonguldakspor footballers
Süper Lig players
TFF Second League players